"Music" is a 1976 single by John Miles, from his album Rebel, produced by Alan Parsons. It was successful in Europe reaching #1 on the Dutch Singles Chart, #3 on the UK Singles Chart and #10 on the German Singles Chart. It reached #88 on the Billboard Hot 100. In 1982 the song was rereleased in The Netherlands and reached #4.

The song was re-released in November 2009, in collaboration with the Belgian dance-act Sylver, of which Miles's son (guitarist John Miles jr.) is part of.

Charts

Personnel
 John Miles: lead vocals, piano, guitar, harpsichord
 Bob Marshall: bass
 Barry Black: drums, percussion
 Andrew Powell: orchestral arrangements

References 

1970s ballads
1976 songs
1976 singles
British progressive rock songs
Decca Records singles
London Records singles
Rock ballads
Song recordings produced by Alan Parsons
Music